Sasanian coinage was produced within the domains of the Iranian Sasanian Empire (224–651). Together with the Roman Empire, the Sasanian Empire was the most important money-issuing polity in Late Antiquity. Sasanian coinage had a significant influence on coinage of other polities. Sasanian coins are a pivotal primary source for the study of the Sasanian period, and of major importance in history and art history in general. The Sylloge nummorum Sasanidarum is the most important primary work of reference for Sasanian coins.

Context

The main denomination of the Sasanians, introduced by King Ardashir I (224–242) and inherited from the Parthians, was the silver drachm (Middle Persian: drahm). It is a large thin coin (a novelty at the time) that weighs about 4 grams, with a diameter of 25-30 mm. It was made of rather pure silver and produced in large quantities by all Sasanian kings. Several Sasanian rulers also issued fractional silver (in much smaller numbers). Some of these fractional coins include the hemidrachm, the obol and the tetradrachm. Ardashir I had most likely inherited the hemidrachm and the obol from the monetary system of his home province, Persis (i.e. Pars). Coins of copper and (uncommonly) lead were produced under various reigns.

However, the tetradrachm already fell into disfavor in the early Sasanian period, during the reign of Bahram I (271-74), as it was mostly made out of copper with only a tiny bit of silver. Hemidrachms also only appeared at the beginning of the Sasanian period. Obols and hemiobols were used for a longer period, but they were only sporadically used for special occasions (e.g. investiture gifts, throwing in crowds). Production of the hemidrachms and tetradrachms eventually ceased under Bahram II (274-93), but the Iranian variant of the obol, the dang (a Middle Persian word), was minted until the end of Kavad I's reign in the early 6th century.

Gold coins were produced in limited amounts and were mainly minted "for purposes of publicity and to compete with Roman and Kushan gold". Gold dinars (Middle Persian: dēnār, ultimately from Latin denarius aureus) were also introduced by Ardashir I, the first Sasanian ruler. Gold coinage was unknown to the Parthian monetary system, the predecessor of the Sasanian. Gold Sasanian coins weigh between 7 and 7.4 grams until Shapur III's reign (383–388). Minting of copper coins was very limited in the Sasanian Empire.

During over four hundred years of Sasanian history, minting coins was a sole privilege of the ruling royal, and the typology employed on Sasanian coinage was invariably the same in every part of the empire; this shows that Sasanian mints were under tight control of the royal central authorities. Other than being used for paying taxes, the precise context of Sasanian coinage as money within the empire remains unclear. However, it is known that a large part of Sasanian coinage was used to pay soldiers and troops. Therefore, according to Philippe Gignoux and Michael Bates, Shapur II (309–379) and Peroz I (459–484) "must have" increased coin production during their reigns, as they conducted numerous campaigns. Massive quantities were minted under Kavad I, Khosrow I (531–579) and Khosrow II (590–628), who were involved in high-profile wars. All Sasanian coins were hand struck, and, like in the Roman Empire, coin production was regulated according to "accurate and well-organized plans".

Iconography and typology

Sasanian coins show a very consistent type of iconography, from the 3rd century to the 7th century, "though in point of style its portraits and reverses become progressively stylized". In the words of Rebecca Darley and Matthew Canepa:

Sasanian coinage of Sindh

The Sasanian coinage of Sindh refers to a series of Sasanian-style issues, minted from 325 to 480 CE minted in Sindh, in the southern part of modern Pakistan, with the coin type of successive Sasanian Empire rulers, from Shapur II to Peroz I. Together with the coinage of the Kushano-Sasanians, these coins are often described as "Indo-Sasanian". They form an important part of Sasanian coinage.

Influence on coinage of other polities
According to Darley and Canepa, Sasanian coinage was used extensively in trade, especially with Central Asia and China, and it formed a model for types struck in areas adjacent to the Sasanian Empire, including areas ruled by the Hepthalites and Kidarites. Following the Arab conquest of Iran, the Umayyad Caliphate copied Sasanian coinage but typically added some Arabic legends to the coins. However some coins of this period were struck without any Arabic text. These so-called Arab-Sasanian coins were minted in the heartlands of the former Sasanian Empire and followed Sasanian motives, including the depiction of the Zoroastrian fire altar. When during the reign of Abd al-Malik ibn Marwan ( 685–705) a new "aniconic" Muslim coinage was created, the new Islamic silver dirham still "owed its distinctive silver fabric and wide flan to Sasanian minting techniques".

Indo-Sasanian coinage (530 to 1202 CE)

There is also a whole category of Indian coins, in the "Indo-Sassanian style", that were derived from the Sasanian design in a rather geometric fashion, among the Gurjaras, Pratiharas, Chaulukya-Paramara and Palas from circa 530 CE to 1202 CE. Typically, the bust of the king on the obverse is highly simplified and geometric, and the design of the fire altar, with or without the two attendants, appears as a geometrical motif on the reverse of this type of coinage.

See also
 Achaemenid coinage
 Parthian coinage
 Roman currency
 Byzantine coinage

References

Sources

Further reading

External links
 Sylloge Nummorum Sasanidarum

Sasanian Empire
Ancient currencies